Hapalioloemus macheralis is a species of tachinid flies in the genus Hapalioloemus of the family Tachinidae.

External links

Exoristinae